Sackville is the given name of:

Sackville Carden (1857-1930), British First World War admiral
Sir Sackville Crowe, 1st Baronet ( 1595–1671), English politician
Sackville Currie (born 1955), Irish modern pentathlete
Sackville Hamilton (1732-1818), Anglo-Irish politician
Sackville Lane-Fox, 12th Baron Conyers (1827-1888), British peer and soldier
Sackville Pelham, 5th Earl of Yarborough (1888-1948), British peer and soldier
Sackville Stopford-Sackville (1840-1926), British politician
Sackville Trevor (c. 1565–1633), Welsh sea captain and Member of Parliament
Sackville Tufton (disambiguation)